Palo Seco Velodrome is a multi-use stadium in Palo Seco, Trinidad and Tobago.  It is currently used mostly for football matches and is the home stadium of United Petrotrin.  The stadium holds 10,000 people.

It is the only major sporting facility in East Saint Patrick County.

References 

Football venues in Trinidad and Tobago
United Petrotrin F.C.